Zły (Polish for evil), was a Polish magazine that was created by Małgorzata Daniszewska, the wife of Jerzy Urban.

History and profile
Zły was published from 1998 to 2000. The magazine contained real stories of crime and of real accidents. Often the articles included additional photos and illustrations which appeared macabre. In 2000, workers at the magazine's distributor, Ruch, refused to distribute the magazine to kiosks.

References

External links
Zły web archives

1998 establishments in Poland
2000 disestablishments in Poland
Defunct magazines published in Poland
Magazines established in 1998
Magazines disestablished in 2000
Magazines published in Warsaw
Polish-language magazines